The Elson-Dudley House is a historic home located at 1101 29th Avenue, Meridian, Mississippi. Built in 1894 by Julius and Dora Neubauer Elson, some of Meridian's earliest settlers, the home is a Victorian Eastlake movement home with Queen Anne influence. The home was listed on the National Register of Historic Places on December 18, 1979, under the Meridian Multiple Property Submission. It is also part of Merrehope Historic District, which was listed on the National Register on September 19, 1988.

The "pink house", as it is known locally, prominently features pedimented gables, a front veranda with a corner, conical-roofed turret, and a conical roofed tower. The front porch features turned balusters with center beads and the multi-panel entrance door is headed by a stained glass transom.

The , 16-room mansion sits on a   lot and takes up half a city block. The Elson-Dudley house contains 4 bedrooms and 2.5 bathrooms. The house holds 10 fireplaces, 5 chimneys, a grand staircase, and sports an asymmetrical facade.

Ownership history

LaWanda Burke, a retired florist, and her son Barry of Tuscaloosa, Alabama, purchased the home in 1989 from long-time owners the Dudley family. A 2-year renovation of the home was completed by the Burkes at this time which included installation of commercial grade central heat and air system, removal of old roof and installation of new roof shingles, structural foundation restoration, automatic driveway gate, construction of a carriage house for storage and car parking behind the home, storm windows, interior paint, historically correct exterior lighting fixtures and historically Victorian correct pink and rose accent paint (the house was previously green). A National Register of Historic Places marker was also added near the front door by the Burkes. A tapestry custom sewn by LaWanda Burke is visible in the front window of the parlor room. LaWanda Burke also filled the home with period correct antiques and resided in the home.

LaWanda Burke died of complications of cancer in the home in 1992. The home became owned solely by Barry Burke and he was married to Karen Keith of Meridian in the home on March 28, 1992. Barry Burke sold the home in 1993 upon moving to Atlanta, Georgia.

External links
National Register of Historic Places

References

Houses in Meridian, Mississippi
Houses on the National Register of Historic Places in Mississippi
Houses completed in 1894
National Register of Historic Places in Lauderdale County, Mississippi
Individually listed contributing properties to historic districts on the National Register in Mississippi